Eristalis anthophorina, the orange-spotted drone fly, is a species of syrphid fly with a Holarctic distribution. It is a common fly in wetlands, including bogs, fens, and woodland pools. In North America, it occurs throughout much of Canada and primarily in the northern parts of the United States. It may be introduced in North America.

Distribution
This species is  Holarctic in distribution.It is widely distributed worldwide in northern North American and Europe. It is a common  in wetlands, including bogs, fens, and woodland pools. In North America, it occurs throughout much of Canada and primarily in the northern parts of the United States. It may be introduced in North America.
external map

Description
This fly can easily be confused with bumblebees.
 Head
The face is reddish-yellow pollinose, with white pilose  sides and a shining black median stripe and with black broadly on the cheeks (gena).  The antennae are black with the arista reddish and pubescent near the base. The eyes are completely pilose, holoptic in the male
Thorax
The thorax is black with long yellow hairs. The  scutellum is wholly yellow, densely covered with  yellow pile. 
Abdomen
The first abdominal segment is black. The second segment is broadly shining with orange spots laterally. The remaining abdomen is black with long yellow-orange pile.
Wings 
The wings are nearly hyaline. The stigmatic spot is dark brown with a broad, distinct, brownish spot in the middle of the wing. Wing veination: sinuous r4+5, closed cell r1  anterior cross- vein (r-m) near the middle of discal cell (dm), oblique.
Legs
The legs are black, with black pile. The tibia is yellowish at the base. '

Ecology
It has been observed visiting the flowers of Verbena hastata (blue vervain), Salix myricoides (blue-leaved willow), and Hesperis matronalis (dame's rocket).

References

Eristalinae
Articles created by Qbugbot
Insects described in 1817
Taxa named by Carl Fredrik Fallén